Tup Qarah (also Romanized as Tūp Qarah and Tūp Qareh; also known as Tupkarekh and Tūp Qarā’) is a village in, and the capital of, Howmeh Rural District of Do Tappeh District of Khodabandeh County, Zanjan province, Iran.

At the 2006 National Census, its population was 1,187 in 266 households, when it was in the Central District. The following census in 2011 counted 1,024 people in 298 households. The latest census in 2016 showed a population of 890 people in 277 households. Howmeh Rural District became a part of Do Tappeh District at its establishment in 2019.

References 

Khodabandeh County

Populated places in Zanjan Province

Populated places in Khodabandeh County